Omar Campos may refer to:

Omar Campos (footballer, born 2000), Salvadoran football midfielder
Omar Campos (footballer, born 2002), Mexican football wingback